KUPT-LD, virtual channels 2 and 16 (UHF digital channel 32), is a low-power Movies!-affiliated television station licensed to Albuquerque, New Mexico, United States. Owned by the Telemundo Station Group subsidiary of NBCUniversal, it is sister to Telemundo owned-and-operated station KASA-TV (channel 2), KTEL-CD (channel 15), and KRTN-LD (channel 33). KUPT-LD's transmitter is located at Sandia Crest.

History
KUPT-LD has been on the air since late August 2014 airing both Movies! and GetTV. In early February 2015, H&I was added and became the main channel but in May it moved to channel 16.3 with Movies! returning to 16.1. On February 2, 2016, GetTV moved to CBS affiliate KRQE's second digital subchannel, and then later to KASY-TV channel 50.3 on January 14, 2017.

On January 18, 2017, Ramar Communications took over the operations of KASA-TV a full powered station and former Fox network affiliate. Telemundo has replaced Fox on channel 2.1 while H&I was shown on channel 29.1 and Movies! on 33.1. Since then KUPT-LD has continued to air these channels as duplicates, however it now serves to provide additional Spanish-language programming remapped to 2.2.

The FCC spectrum auction which concluded on April 13, 2017 removes part of the UHF spectrum from channels 38-51 for television broadcast. KTFQ-TV was assigned the channel 16 position moving over from channel 42 as part of a spectrum repacking. This displaced KUPT-LD which had to move to a different channel number to continue broadcasting. In 2019 it moved to digital channel 32 while remapping to virtual channels 2 & 16.

Technical information

Subchannels
The station's digital signal is multiplexed:

References

External links

UPT-LD
Television channels and stations established in 2014
Mass media in Albuquerque, New Mexico
LX (TV network) affiliates
Movies! affiliates
Cozi TV affiliates
TeleXitos affiliates
Low-power television stations in the United States
2014 establishments in New Mexico
Telemundo Station Group